Let Down may refer to:

Music
 Let Down (Bif Naked song)
 Let Down (Dead by Sunrise song)
 Let Down (Paris Jackson song)
 Let Down (Radiohead song)

Other uses
 Let-down reflex, a release of milk from a lactating woman's nipples